Die Inseln der Weisheit (The Islands of Wisdom) is a 1922 novel by Alexander Moszkowski that features expeditions to various utopian and dystopian islands that embody various social-political ideas of European philosophy and extrapolates them for their absurdities when they are put into practice.

The novel's "island of technology" Sarragalla anticipates mobile telephones and a thorough mechanization of life. 

The satire of utopias also reproduces the society described in Plato's The Republic.

References

External links
 The book online (German)

German science fiction novels
1922 German-language novels
1922 science fiction novels
Utopian novels
Dystopian novels
German satirical novels
Works about Platonism
1922 German novels
Buddhist novels
Novels set on islands
Novels about telepathy
Novels about telekinesis